The Pacific Coast Light Heavyweight Championship was a professional wrestling championship that was contended for in the Pacific Northwest from the 1920s to the mid-1950s.

Title history
Silver areas in the history indicate periods of unknown lineage.

References

Pacific Northwest Wrestling championships
National Wrestling Alliance championships
Light heavyweight wrestling championships